William Frederick Morris was Dean of Clogher from 1959 until 1962.

He was educated at Trinity College, Dublin and ordained in 1909.  After a curacy in Drumkeeran he held  incumbencies at Clogher, Muckno and Castleblayney  until his time as Dean.

References

Irish Anglicans
Alumni of Trinity College Dublin
Deans of Clogher
20th-century Irish clergy
Year of birth missing
Year of death missing